Indian Association of Amusement Parks and Industries (IAAPI) is an apex body representing the interests of Amusement Parks, Theme Parks, Water Parks and Indoor Amusement Centres in India. IAAPI is a non-government, not-for-profit, industry-led and industry-managed organization, playing a proactive role in development of this sector. Founded in 1999, IAAPI is India's premier business association having more than 461 members from the private sectors including small and medium enterprises consisting of park operators and equipment manufacturers. IAAPI is also recognized and affiliated by various international trade bodies operating in the amusement sector.

IAAPI represents location-based entertainment facilities, including amusement and theme parks, snow parks, indoor amusement centers, arcades, museums, water parks, aquariums, science centers, zoos, bowling alleys and resorts. It also represents industry equipment manufacturers, distributors, operators, industry suppliers, and service providers. IAAPI has its head office in Mumbai and has four regional chapter and sector relevant committees headed by industry leaders. IAAPI serves as a reference point for Indian amusement sector.

Events 

The association operates an yearly exhibition by the name of IAAPI Amusement Expo. In the expo IAAPI offers educational, informational, operational, safety, and leadership seminars and behind-the-scenes tours of member amusement parks, theme parks, water parks, and indoor amusement centers.

During the COVID-19 pandemic, the themed entertainment industry faced significant pressures. IAAPI was among a number of themed entertainment organizations whose members faced potential billions in losses as a result. The IAAPI 2021 Expo was postponed by a year due to the pandemic.

IAAPI Amusement Expo 2023 is set to be held from 1st till 3rd March 2023 at Bombay Exhibition Centre, Mumbai. This year the Expo is expected to attract huge foot fall as it is been held after a long gap due to the Covid-19 pandemic. Exhibitors from 14 countries are expected to participate in the event.

Awards 
IAAPI publishes its magazine, Thriller, the official magazine for members. It also comes with monthly newsletter to keep its membership informed about current and pending federal, state and local amusement-related laws and legislation.

Thriller Magazine Publication 
IAAPI publishes its magazine, Thriller, the official magazine for members. It also comes with monthly newsletter to keep its membership informed about current and pending federal, state and local amusement-related laws and legislation.

Services 
IAAPI offers training in every aspect of the amusement-park and attractions industry and provides member facilities with opportunities to educate their personnel with workshops, on-site seminars, videotapes, manuals and webinars. The association promotes amusement park safety standards to its members and regularly does safety conclaves. It also does a yearly offshore training program knows as AMTP.

References

External links 
 
 IAAPI training program
 IAAPI magazine - Thriller

Amusement parks
Trade associations based in India